Lawrence Douglas Lamb (born 1 October 1947) is an English actor and radio presenter. He played Archie Mitchell in the BBC soap opera EastEnders, Mick Shipman in the BBC comedy series Gavin & Stacey and Ted Case in the final series of the BBC drama New Tricks. He also appeared on I'm a Celebrity...Get Me Out of Here! in 2016.

Early life
Lamb was born in Edmonton, Middlesex, to Jessie White and Ronald Douglas Lamb, the eldest of four including his brother, Wesley, and a sister. Lamb had a turbulent childhood; he was verbally abused by his father and often had to keep his parents from fighting.

In 2011, Lamb participated in the BBC series Who Do You Think You Are? and discovered that he is descended from a line of proprietors of a well-known travelling menagerie, Day's Menagerie, and a lion tamer named Martini Bartlett.

Lamb attended Edmonton County School and on leaving school he worked as a lorry driver's mate (assistant) for at that time the UK's largest Waste Paper Merchant J & J Maybank. Later, he joined the oil industry, which resulted in his working in Libya and Canada, where he attended St. Francis Xavier University in Antigonish, Nova Scotia. This developed his amateur interest in acting to a professional level, and he performed at Canada's Stratford Festival in 1975–1976. Lamb is distantly related to Edward Buckton Lamb (1806–1869), a Victorian architect who designed St Martin's Gospel Oak and St Mary Addiscombe.

Career

Acting
After returning to Britain from Canada, Lamb became a regular cast member, along with Kate O'Mara, in the BBC's North Sea ferry-based soap Triangle (1981–83), in which he played Matt Taylor, the ship's Chief Engineer.

Other credits include The New Avengers, The Professionals, Fox, Minder, Lovejoy, Get Back, A Touch of Frost, Our Friends in the North, Taggart, Casualty, Kavanagh QC, Spooks, Midsomer Murders, and The Bill.

Between 2007 and 2010, Lamb appeared in Gavin & Stacey playing Gavin's father, Michael "Mick" Shipman.

In 2008, Lamb began playing Archie Mitchell, the father of Ronnie and Roxy Mitchell in EastEnders. He based his portrayal of Archie on his own father. He left the show in April, 2009, but returned in July the same year, around the same time that Danniella Westbrook returned to her role of Archie's niece, Sam Mitchell. Archie was killed off in a murder story line at Christmas, 2009. In 2009, Lamb starred alongside Liam Cunningham in Blood: The Last Vampire, in the role of General McKee. On 19 February 2010, Lamb appeared with his son, George Lamb, in EastEnders Live: The Aftermath, after Stacey Branning was revealed to be Archie's killer in the closing moments of the 25th-anniversary live episode.

In April, 2011, BBC Learning launched "Off By Heart Shakespeare", a school-recital contest for secondary school pupils. For the project, Larry took on the role of Jaques from the play As You Like It, and delivered the speech: "All the world's a stage".

It was announced that Lamb would join the cast of New Tricks as Ted Case in series 12, taking over from Gerry Standing, played by Dennis Waterman.

Lamb's films include Buster and Essex Boys. In 1983, he had a small speaking role in Superman III.

Theatre
Theatre work includes:

Other work
In 2013, Lamb began presenting a regular Sunday morning show on LBC. He is an occasional reporter for the BBC programme The One Show. Lamb took part in Gareth's All Star Choir in 2014, as part of the BBC's Children in Need appeal.

In 2016, he appeared in the sixteenth series of I'm a Celebrity...Get Me Out of Here!. He became the 6th celebrity to be voted out of the jungle in the 2016 series.

Personal life

Lamb has a daughter Vanessa Lamb (born 1969) with his first wife Anita Wisbey. He is also the father of radio DJ and television presenter George Lamb, from his second marriage to Linda Martin. Lamb split up with his partner, Clare Burt, with whom he has two daughters: Eloise Alexandra (born 1998), and Eva-Mathilde Lamb (born 2003). Lamb has one granddaughter from his daughter Vanessa, as revealed on I'm A Celebrity...Get Me Out of Here!.

Lamb's autobiography Mummy's Boy was published in 2011.

Lamb resides in Cornwall.

Awards and nominations
Lamb won the award for Best Villain at the 2010 British Soap Awards.

Filmography
Film

Television

The New Avengers... (1 episode, 1977)... Williams
Hazell (1 episode, 1979)... Ned Barrow
The Dick Francis Thriller: The Racing Game (1 episode, 1979)... Steve
Armchair Thriller (4 episodes, 1980)... CPO Chalky White
Fox (11 episodes, 1980)... Joey Fox
The Professionals (1 episode, 1980)... Jack Craine
Saturday Night Thriller (1 episode, 1982)... Mr. Roy Salinger (Only for a second)
Triangle (78 episodes, 1981–83)... Matt Taylor
Jemima Shore Investigates (1 episode, 1983)... Max Highams
Minder (1 episode, 1984)... Greg Collins
Christopher Columbus (1985)... Don Castillo
Boon (1 episode, 1986)... Alan Prendergest
 Slip-Up (1986)... Ronald Arthur Biggs
Harry's Kingdom (1987)... Terry Stewart
Theatre Night (1 episode, 1987)... The Sergeant
Fratelli (1988)... Mauro Barberi
Pursuit (1989)... Davi
A Little Piece of Sunshine (1990)... Desmond HannahScreenplay (1 episode, 1991)... UNKNOWNFool's Gold: The Story of the Brink's-Mat Robbery (1992)... Kenneth NoyeLovejoy (2 episodes, 1992)... Gerald SomersTV Hell (1992)... HimselfBetween the Lines (1 episode, 1992)... Dennis RalstonGet Back (3 episodes, 1992)... Albert SweetWhite Goods (1994)... Jonnie DowDoggin Around (1994)... KenIn Suspicious Circumstances (1 episode, 1994)... Weldon AtherstoneThe Wimbledon Poisoner (2 episodes, 1994)... Dr. Donald TempletonA Touch of Frost (1 episode, 1995)... Mike RossStrangers (1 episode, 1996)... LeonardOur Friends in the North (2 episodes, 1996)... Alan RoeAnnie's Bar (10 episodes, 1996)... Terry DunningThe Missing Postman (1997)... Trevor RamsaySupply & Demand (6 episodes, 1998) ... Simon HughesThe Blonde Bombshell (1999)... Will HumphreysTaggart  (1 episode, 1999)...  Martin StrangeCasualty  (1 episode, 1999)... Father Peter Harker Home Sweet Home (2001) (Voice)Kavanagh QC (1 episode, 2001)... Alan RainerMidsomer Murders (1 episode, 2001)... Melvyn StockardCathedral (2005) Thomas a BeckettMurphy's Law (4 episodes, 2005)... George GarveyThe Bill (20 episodes, 2004–05)... Jonathan FoxSilent Witness (1 episode, 2006)... Max WheatonSpooks (1 episode, 2006)... Iain KaillisGavin & Stacey How It Happened (2007)... HimselfMovie Connections (1 episode, 2009)... HimselfFriday Night with Jonathan Ross (1 episode, 2009)... HimselfThe British Soap Awards 2009 (2009)... HimselfWould I Lie to You (1 episode, 2009)... HimselfPaul O'Grady Show (1 episode, 2009)... HimselfGMTV (2 episodes, 2004–09)... HimselfEastEnders  (150 episodes, 2008–09)... Archie Mitchell The Greatest TV Shows of the Noughties (2009) ... Himself/Mick (also archive footage)
Gavin & Stacey (20 episodes, 2007–10, 2019)... Mick Shipman
Gavin & Stacey: The Outtakes (2010)... Himself
The National Television Awards 2010 (2010)... Himself
EastEnders The Greatest Cliffhangers ... Archie Mitchell ... (1 episode, 2010) (also archive footage)... Himself
The One Show (3 episodes, 2009–13)... Himself
Breakfast (1 episode, 2010)... Himself-Actor
EastEnders Live The Aftermath (2010)... Himself-Guest
The Weakest Link (1 episode, 2010)... Himself
Loose Women (3 episodes, 2008–10)... Himself
George and Larry Lamb's Parent Trip (2010)... Himself
The British Soap Awards 2010 (2010)... Himself
An Audience with Michael Buble (2010)... Himself
Men About the House (2010)... Himself
The Million Pound Drop Live (1 episode, 2010)... Himself
My Life on Books (1 episode, 2011)... Himself
The Wright Stuff (2 episodes, 2010–11)... Himself
Celebrity Juice (1 episode, 2011)...Himself
The Magicians (1 episode, 2011)...Himself
When Royals Wed (4 episodes, 2011)...Himself
Who Do You Think You Are? (1 episode, 2011)...Himself
National Treasures Live (1 episode, 2011)...Himself
A Picture of Health (5 episodes)...Himself
Rome: The World's First Superpower (2014)...Himself
Gareth's All Star Choir (2014)...Himself
New Tricks (2015)...Ted Case
I'm A Celebrity Get Me Out of Here (2016)...Himself
Britain By Bike with Larry and George Lamb (2017) – Co-presenter
Pitching In (2019)...
Thunderbirds Are Go (2019)...Gomez
DNA Journey (2021)...Himself
Strictly Come Dancing Christmas Special (2022)... Himself

References

External links

Larry Lamb at Biogs.com

1947 births
People from Edmonton, London
English male film actors
English male television actors
English male soap opera actors
Living people
Male actors from London
English autobiographers
I'm a Celebrity...Get Me Out of Here! (British TV series) participants